Gunillaea is a genus of plants in the family Campanulaceae. It contains two known species, both native to tropical and southern Africa and Madagascar.

 Gunillaea emirnensis (A.DC.) Thulin - Madagascar, Zaire, Tanzania, Angola, Malawi, Zambia, Zimbabwe 
 Gunillaea rhodesica (Adamson) Thulin - Zaire, Angola, Mozambique, Zambia, Zimbabwe, Botswana, Namibia, Caprivi

References

Campanuloideae
Campanulaceae genera